Iranians in Syria are residents of Iranian background or descent residing in Syria. Some of them are Syrian citizens while some are migrants or descendants born in Syria with Iranian ancestry. Many Iranians in Syria live in Damascus.

Notable people

See also
Iran–Syria relations
Iranian diaspora
Iranian support for Syria in the Syrian Civil War

References

Syria
Ethnic groups in Syria
Syria
Middle Eastern diaspora in Syria